Belleplain is an unincorporated community and census-designated place (CDP) located within Dennis Township in Cape May County, New Jersey, United States. As of the 2010 United States Census, the CDP's population was 597.

Geography
According to the United States Census Bureau, Belleplain had a total area of 7.405 square miles (19.178 km2), including 7.394 square miles (19.150 km2) of land and 0.011 square miles (0.029 km2) of water (0.15%).

Demographics

Census 2010

Education
As with other parts of Dennis Township, the area is zoned to Dennis Township Public Schools (for grades K-8) and Middle Township Public Schools (for high school). The latter operates Middle Township High School.

Countywide schools include Cape May County Technical High School and Cape May County Special Services School District.

References

Census-designated places in Cape May County, New Jersey
Dennis Township, New Jersey